Mesnidovirineae is a suborder of enveloped, positive-strand RNA viruses in the order Nidovirales which infect invertebrates. Host organisms include mosquitoes.

Taxonomy 

Medioniviridae
Medionivirinae
Tunicanivirinae
Mesoniviridae
Hexponivirinae

References

Virus suborders
Nidovirales